The Annual Review of Sociology is an annual peer-reviewed review journal published by Annual Reviews since 1975. It is abstracted and indexed in the Social Sciences Citation Index.  Journal Citation Reports gives the journal a 2021 impact factor of 10.032, ranking it fourth out of 148 journals in the category "Sociology".

History
In 1969, a joint panel including sociologists from the National Academy of Sciences and the Social Science Research Council made a formal recommendation for the creation of an annual journal that published review articles about sociology. As a result of the recommendation, the American Sociological Association initiated a collaborative agreement with the nonprofit publisher Annual Reviews for the creation of such a journal.
The Annual Review of Sociology was first published in 1975, making it the twentieth Annual Reviews journal title. Additionally, it was the third title in the social sciences after the Annual Review of Psychology in 1950 and the Annual Review of Anthropology in 1972. In 1996 it was published electronically for the first time, making it the first of the twenty-six Annual Reviews titles published online. As of 2020, it was published both in print and electronically.

Scope and indexing
It defines its scope as covering significant developments in sociology, regarding theoretical and methodological applications, as well as subfields like social processes, institutions and organizations, culture, political sociology, economic sociology, social stratification, demography, urban sociology, social policy, historical sociology, and sociology in various regions of the world. Most volumes include a prefatory chapter written by a distinguished sociologist in which they reflect on their career and achievements. As of 2022,  Journal Citation Reports gives the journal a 2021 impact factor of 10.032, ranking it fourth out of 148 journals in the category "Sociology". It is abstracted and indexed in Scopus, IBZ Online, International Bibliography of the Social Sciences, and Academic Search, among others.

Editorial processes

The Annual Review of Sociology is helmed by the editor or the co-editors. The editor is assisted by the editorial committee, which includes associate editors, regular members, and occasionally guest editors. Guest members participate at the invitation of the editor, and serve terms of one year. All other members of the editorial committee are appointed by the Annual Reviews board of directors and serve five-year terms. The editorial committee determines which topics should be included in each volume and solicits reviews from qualified authors. Unsolicited manuscripts are not accepted. Peer review of accepted manuscripts is undertaken by the editorial committee.

Editors of volumes
Dates indicate publication years in which someone was credited as a lead editor or co-editor of a journal volume. The planning process for a volume begins well before the volume appears, so appointment to the position of lead editor generally occurred prior to the first year shown here. An editor who has retired or died may be credited as a lead editor of a volume that they helped to plan, even if it is published after their retirement or death.

 Alex Inkeles (1975–1977; 1979–1980)
 Ralph H. Turner (1978; 1981–1986)
 William Richard Scott (1987–1991)
 Judith Blake (1992–1993)
 John L. Hagan (1994–1997)
 Hagan and Karen S. Cook (1998–2004)
 Cook and Douglas Massey (2005–present)

Current editorial committee
As of 2022, the editorial committee consists of the co-editors and the following members:

 Bruce G. Carruthers
 Camille Zubrinsky Charles
 Jorge G. Durand
 Cynthia Feliciano
 Jeremy Freese
 Kathleen Mullan Harris
 Patrick Sharkey
 Mary C. Waters

See also
 List of sociology journals

References

 

Publications established in 1975
Sociology journals
Annual journals
English-language journals
Sociology